Amagase Dam is an earthen dam located in Saga Prefecture in Japan. The dam is used for agriculture. The catchment area of the dam is 1.6 km2. The dam impounds about 6  ha of land when full and can store 532 thousand cubic meters of water. The construction of the dam was started on 1972 and completed in 1982.

References

Dams in Saga Prefecture
1982 establishments in Japan